Radio Globo is a radio station operating in Tegucigalpa, Honduras. It is known for its opposition to the 2009 Honduran coup d'état as well as being the radio station for 24/7 news channel Globo TV. It is owned by Alejandro Villatoro.

The station is headed by David Romero Ellner.

On September 25, 2009, David Romero asserted that Jews are a problem in Honduras, and supported Hitler and the holocaust.
The Association of Descendants of Sephardic Jews in Honduras issued a public statement against Romero Ellner. On September 28, 2009 it was taken off the air by the de facto Honduran government, which was able to do so due to a decree suspending some articles of the constitution of Honduras, On October 19, 2009 it went back on the air. It was awarded an Ondas Award for the best Iberoamericanan radio station for the team effort of fighting against the censorship of de facto government in 2009.

References

External links
Official site

Radio stations in Honduras
Antisemitic attacks and incidents